Gibran Khalil Gibran (or , ; January 6, 1883 – April 10, 1931), usually referred to in English as Kahlil Gibran (pronounced  ), was a Lebanese-American writer, poet and visual artist; he was also considered a philosopher, although he himself rejected the title. He is best known as the author of The Prophet, which was first published in the United States in 1923 and has since become one of the best-selling books of all time, having been translated into more than 100 languages.

Born in a village of the Ottoman-ruled Mount Lebanon Mutasarrifate to a Maronite family, young Gibran immigrated with his mother and siblings to the United States in 1895. As his mother worked as a seamstress, he was enrolled at a school in Boston, where his creative abilities were quickly noticed by a teacher who presented him to photographer and publisher F. Holland Day. Gibran was sent back to his native land by his family at the age of fifteen to enroll at the Collège de la Sagesse in Beirut. Returning to Boston upon his youngest sister's death in 1902, he lost his older half-brother and his mother the following year, seemingly relying afterwards on his remaining sister's income from her work at a dressmaker's shop for some time.

In 1904, Gibran's drawings were displayed for the first time at Day's studio in Boston, and his first book in Arabic was published in 1905 in New York City. With the financial help of a newly met benefactress, Mary Haskell, Gibran studied art in Paris from 1908 to 1910. While there, he came in contact with Syrian political thinkers promoting rebellion in Ottoman Syria after the Young Turk Revolution; some of Gibran's writings, voicing the same ideas as well as anti-clericalism, would eventually be banned by the Ottoman authorities. In 1911, Gibran settled in New York, where his first book in English, The Madman, would be published by Alfred A. Knopf in 1918, with writing of The Prophet or The Earth Gods also underway. His visual artwork was shown at Montross Gallery in 1914, and at the galleries of M. Knoedler & Co. in 1917. He had also been corresponding remarkably with May Ziadeh since 1912. In 1920, Gibran re-founded the Pen League with fellow Mahjari poets. By the time of his death at the age of 48 from cirrhosis and incipient tuberculosis in one lung, he had achieved literary fame on "both sides of the Atlantic Ocean," and The Prophet had already been translated into German and French. His body was transferred to his birth village of Bsharri (in present-day Lebanon), to which he had bequeathed all future royalties on his books, and where a museum dedicated to his works now stands.

As worded by Suheil Bushrui and Joe Jenkins, Gibran's life has been described as one "often caught between Nietzschean rebellion, Blakean pantheism and Sufi mysticism." Gibran discussed different themes in his writings, and explored diverse literary forms. Salma Khadra Jayyusi has called him "the single most important influence on Arabic poetry and literature during the first half of [the twentieth] century," and he is still celebrated as a literary hero in Lebanon. At the same time, "most of Gibran's paintings expressed his personal vision, incorporating spiritual and mythological symbolism," with art critic Alice Raphael recognizing in the painter a classicist, whose work owed "more to the findings of Da Vinci than it [did] to any modern insurgent." His "prodigious body of work" has been described as "an artistic legacy to people of all nations."

Life

Childhood

Gibran was born January 6, 1883, in the village of Bsharri in the Mount Lebanon Mutasarrifate, Ottoman Syria (modern-day Lebanon). His parents, Khalil Sa'ad Gibran and Kamila Rahmeh, the daughter of a priest, were Maronite Christian. As written by Bushrui and Jenkins, they would set for Gibran an example of tolerance by "refusing to perpetuate religious prejudice and bigotry in their daily lives." Kamila's paternal grandfather had converted from Islam to Christianity. She was thirty when Gibran was born, and Gibran's father, Khalil, was her third husband. Gibran had two younger sisters, Marianna and Sultana, and an older half-brother, Boutros, from one of Kamila's previous marriages. Gibran's family lived in poverty. In 1888, Gibran entered Bsharri's one-class school, which was run by a priest, and there he learnt the rudiments of Arabic, Syriac, and arithmetic.

Gibran's father initially worked in an apothecary, but he had gambling debts he was unable to pay. He went to work for a local Ottoman-appointed administrator. In 1891, while acting as a tax collector, he was removed and his staff was investigated. Khalil was imprisoned for embezzlement, and his family's property was confiscated by the authorities. Kamila decided to follow her brother to the United States. Although Khalil was released in 1894, Kamila remained resolved and left for New York on June 25, 1895, taking Boutros, Gibran, Marianna and Sultana with her.

Kamila and her children settled in Boston's South End, at the time the second-largest Syrian-Lebanese-American community in the United States. Gibran entered the Josiah Quincy School on September 30, 1895. School officials placed him in a special class for immigrants to learn English. His name was registered using the anglicized spelling 'Kahlil Gibran'. His mother began working as a seamstress peddler, selling lace and linens that she carried from door-to-door. His half-brother Boutros opened a shop. Gibran also enrolled in an art school at Denison House, a nearby settlement house. Through his teachers there, he was introduced to the avant-garde Boston artist, photographer and publisher F. Holland Day, who encouraged and supported Gibran in his creative endeavors. In March 1898, Gibran met Josephine Preston Peabody, eight years his senior, at an exhibition of Day's photographs "in which Gibran's face was a major subject." Gibran would develop a romantic attachment to her. The same year, a publisher used some of Gibran's drawings for book covers.

Kamila and Boutros wanted Gibran to absorb more of his own heritage rather than just the Western aesthetic culture he was attracted to. Thus, at the age of 15, Gibran returned to his homeland to study Arabic literature for three years at the Collège de la Sagesse, a Maronite-run institute in Beirut, also learning French. In his final year at the school, Gibran created a student magazine with other students, including Youssef Howayek (who would remain a lifelong friend of his), and he was made the "college poet." Gibran graduated from the school at eighteen with high honors, then went to Paris to learn painting, visiting Greece, Italy, and Spain on his way there from Beirut. On April 2, 1902, Sultana died at the age of 14, from what is believed to have been tuberculosis. Upon learning about it, Gibran returned to Boston, arriving two weeks after Sultana's death. The following year, on March 12, Boutros died of the same disease, with his mother passing from cancer on June 28. Two days later, Peabody "left him without explanation." Marianna supported Gibran and herself by working at a dressmaker's shop.

Debuts, Mary Haskell, and second stay in Paris

Gibran held his first art exhibition of his drawings in January 1904 in Boston at Day's studio. During this exhibition, Gibran met Mary Haskell, the headmistress of a girls' school in the city, nine years his senior. The two formed a friendship that lasted the rest of Gibran's life. Haskell would spend large sums of money to support Gibran and would also edit all of his English writings. The nature of their romantic relationship remains obscure; while some biographers assert the two were lovers but never married because Haskell's family objected, other evidence suggests that their relationship was never physically consummated. Gibran and Haskell were engaged briefly between 1910 and 1911. According to Joseph P. Ghougassian, Gibran had proposed to her "not knowing how to repay back in gratitude to Miss Haskell," but Haskell called it off, making it "clear to him that she preferred his friendship to any burdensome tie of marriage." Haskell would later marry Jacob Florance Minis in 1926, while remaining Gibran's close friend, patroness and benefactress, and using her influence to advance his career.

In 1905, Gibran's first published written work was A Profile of the Art of Music, in Arabic, by Al-Mohajers printing department in New York City. His next work, Nymphs of the Valley, was published the following year, also in Arabic. On January 27, 1908, Haskell introduced Gibran to her friend writer Charlotte Teller, aged 31, and in February, to Émilie Michel (Micheline), a French teacher at Haskell's school, aged 19. Both Teller and Micheline agreed to pose for Gibran as models and became close friends of his. The same year, Gibran published Spirits Rebellious in Arabic, a novel deeply critical of secular and spiritual authority. According to Barbara Young, a late acquaintance of Gibran, "in an incredibly short time it was burned in the market place in Beirut by priestly zealots who pronounced it 'dangerous, revolutionary, and poisonous to youth. The Maronite Patriarchate would let the rumor of his excommunication wander, but would never officially pronounce it.

In July 1908, with Haskell's financial support, Gibran went to study art in Paris at the Académie Julian where he joined the atelier of Jean-Paul Laurens. Gibran had accepted Haskell's offer partly so as to distance himself from Micheline, "for he knew that this love was contrary to his sense of gratefulness toward Miss Haskell"; however, "to his surprise Micheline came unexpectedly to him in Paris." "She became pregnant, but the pregnancy was ectopic, and she had to have an abortion, probably in France." Micheline had returned to the United States by late October. Gibran would pay her a visit upon her return to Paris in July 1910, but there would be no hint of intimacy left between them.

By early February 1909, Gibran had "been working for a few weeks in the studio of Pierre Marcel-Béronneau", and he "used his sympathy towards Béronneau as an excuse to leave the Académie Julian altogether." In December 1909, Gibran started a series of pencil portraits that he would later call "The Temple of Art", featuring "famous men and women artists of the day" and "a few of Gibran's heroes from past times." While in Paris, Gibran also entered into contact with Syrian political dissidents, in whose activities he would attempt to be more involved upon his return to the United States. In June 1910, Gibran visited London with Howayek and Ameen Rihani, whom Gibran had met in Paris. Rihani, who was six years older than Gibran, would be Gibran's role model for a while, and a friend until at least May 1912. Gibran biographer Robin Waterfield argues that, by 1918, "as Gibran's role changed from that of angry young man to that of prophet, Rihani could no longer act as a paradigm". Haskell (in her private journal entry of May 29, 1924) and Howayek also provided hints at an enmity that began between Gibran and Rihani sometime after May 1912.

Return to the United States and growing reputation

Gibran sailed back to New York City from Boulogne-sur-Mer on the Nieuw Amsterdam October 22, 1910, and was back to Boston by November 11. By February 1911, Gibran had joined the Boston branch of a Syrian international organization, the Golden Links Society. He lectured there for several months "in order to promote radicalism in independence and liberty" from Ottoman Syria. At the end of April, Gibran was staying in Teller's vacant flat at 164 Waverly Place in New York City. "Gibran settled in, made himself known to his Syrian friends—especially Amin Rihani, who was now living in New York—and began both to look for a suitable studio and to sample the energy of New York." As Teller returned on May 15, he moved to Rihani's small room at 28 West 9th Street. Gibran then moved to one of the Tenth Street Studio Building's studios for the summer, before changing to another of its studios (number 30, which had a balcony, on the third story) in fall. Gibran would live there until his death, referring to it as "The Hermitage." Over time, however, and "ostensibly often for reasons of health," he would spend "longer and longer periods away from New York, sometimes months at a time [...], staying either with friends in the countryside or with Marianna in Boston or on the Massachusetts coast." His friendships with Teller and Micheline would wane; the last encounter between Gibran and Teller would occur in September 1912, and Gibran would tell Haskell in 1914 that he now found Micheline "repellent."

In 1912, Broken Wings was published in Arabic by the printing house of the periodical Meraat-ul-Gharb in New York. Gibran presented a copy of his book to Lebanese writer May Ziadeh, who lived in Egypt, and asked her to criticize it. As worded by Ghougassian,

Gibran and Ziadeh never met. According to Shlomit C. Schuster, "whatever the relationship between Kahlil and May might have been, the letters in A Self-Portrait mainly reveal their literary ties. Ziadeh reviewed all of Gibran's books and Gibran replies to these reviews elegantly."

In 1913, Gibran started contributing to Al-Funoon, an Arabic-language magazine that had been recently established by Nasib Arida and Abd al-Masih Haddad. A Tear and a Smile was published in Arabic in 1914. In December of the same year, visual artworks by Gibran were shown at the Montross Gallery, catching the attention of American painter Albert Pinkham Ryder. Gibran wrote him a prose poem in January and would become one of the aged man's last visitors. After Ryder's death in 1917, Gibran's poem would be quoted first by Henry McBride in the latter's posthumous tribute to Ryder, then by newspapers across the country, from which would come the first widespread mention of Gibran's name in America. By March 1915, two of Gibran's poems had also been read at the Poetry Society of America, after which Corinne Roosevelt Robinson, the younger sister of Theodore Roosevelt, stood up and called them "destructive and diabolical stuff"; nevertheless, beginning in 1918 Gibran would become a frequent visitor at Robinson's, also meeting her brother.

The Madman, the Pen League, and The Prophet
Gibran acted as a secretary of the Syrian–Mount Lebanon Relief Committee, which was formed in June 1916. The same year, Gibran met Lebanese author Mikhail Naimy after Naimy had moved from the University of Washington to New York. Naimy, whom Gibran would nickname "Mischa," had previously made a review of Broken Wings in his article "The Dawn of Hope After the Night of Despair", published in Al-Funoon, and he would become "a close friend and confidant, and later one of Gibran's biographers." In 1917, an exhibition of forty wash drawings was held at Knoedler in New York from January 29 to February 19 and another of thirty such drawings at Doll & Richards, Boston, April 16–28.

While most of Gibran's early writings had been in Arabic, most of his work published after 1918 was in English. Such was The Madman, Gibran's first book published by Alfred A. Knopf in 1918. The Processions (in Arabic) and Twenty Drawings were published the following year. In 1920, Gibran re-created the Arabic-language New York Pen League with Arida and Haddad (its original founders), Rihani, Naimy, and other Mahjari writers such as Elia Abu Madi. The same year, The Tempests was published in Arabic in Cairo, and The Forerunner in New York.

In a letter of 1921 to Naimy, Gibran reported that doctors had told him to "give up all kinds of work and exertion for six months, and do nothing but eat, drink and rest"; in 1922, Gibran was ordered to "stay away from cities and city life" and had rented a cottage near the sea, planning to move there with Marianna and to remain until "this heart [regained] its orderly course"; this three-month summer in Scituate, he later told Haskell, was a refreshing time, during which he wrote some of "the best Arabic poems" he had ever written.

In 1923, The New and the Marvelous was published in Arabic in Cairo, whereas The Prophet was published in New York. The Prophet sold well despite a cool critical reception. At a reading of The Prophet organized by rector William Norman Guthrie in St. Mark's Church in-the-Bowery, Gibran met poetess Barbara Young, who would occasionally work as his secretary from 1925 until Gibran's death; Young did this work without remuneration. In 1924, Gibran told Haskell that he had been contracted to write ten pieces for Al-Hilal in Cairo. In 1925, Gibran participated in the founding of the periodical The New East.

Later years and death

Sand and Foam was published in 1926, and Jesus, the Son of Man in 1928. At the beginning of 1929, Gibran was diagnosed with an enlarged liver. In a letter dated March 26, he wrote to Naimy that "the rheumatic pains are gone, and the swelling has turned to something opposite". In a telegram dated the same day, he reported being told by the doctors that he "must not work for full year," which was something he found "more painful than illness." The last book published during Gibran's life was The Earth Gods, on March 14, 1931.

Gibran was admitted to St. Vincent's Hospital, Manhattan, on April 10, 1931, where he died the same day, aged forty-eight, after refusing the last rites. The cause of death was reported to be cirrhosis of the liver with incipient tuberculosis in one of his lungs. Waterfield argues that the cirrhosis was contracted through excessive drinking of alcohol and was the only real cause of Gibran's death.

Gibran had expressed the wish that he be buried in Lebanon. His body lay temporarily at Mount Benedict Cemetery in Boston, before it was taken on July 23 to Providence, Rhode Island, and from there to Lebanon on the liner Sinaia. Gibran's body reached Bsharri in August and was deposited in a church near-by until a cousin of Gibran finalized the purchase of the Mar Sarkis Monastery, now the Gibran Museum.

All future American royalties to his books were willed to his hometown of Bsharri, to be used for "civic betterment." Gibran had also willed the contents of his studio to Haskell.

In 1950, Haskell donated her personal collection of nearly one hundred original works of art by Gibran (including five oils) to the Telfair Museum of Art in Savannah, Georgia. Haskell had been thinking of placing her collection at the Telfair as early as 1914. Her gift to the Telfair is the largest public collection of Gibran's visual art in the country.

Works

Writings

Forms, themes, and language
Gibran explored literary forms as diverse as "poetry, parables, fragments of conversation, short stories, fables, political essays, letters, and aphorisms." Two plays in English and five plays in Arabic were also published posthumously between 1973 and 1993; three unfinished plays written in English towards the end of Gibran's life remain unpublished (The Banshee, The Last Unction, and The Hunchback or the Man Unseen). Gibran discussed "such themes as religion, justice, free will, science, love, happiness, the soul, the body, and death" in his writings, which were "characterized by innovation breaking with forms of the past, by symbolism, an undying love for his native land, and a sentimental, melancholic yet often oratorical style."

About his language in general (both in Arabic and English), Salma Khadra Jayyusi remarks that "because of the spiritual and universal aspect of his general themes, he seems to have chosen a vocabulary less idiomatic than would normally have been chosen by a modern poet conscious of modernism in language." According to Jean Gibran and Kahlil G. Gibran,

The poem "You Have Your Language and I Have Mine" (1924) was published in response to criticism of his Arabic language and style.

Influences and antecedents
According to Bushrui and Jenkins, an "inexhaustible" source of influence on Gibran was the Bible, especially the King James Version. Gibran's literary oeuvre is also steeped in the Syriac tradition. According to Haskell, Gibran once told her that  As worded by Waterfield, "the parables of the New Testament" affected "his parables and homilies" while "the poetry of some of the Old Testament books" affected "his devotional language and incantational rhythms." Annie Salem Otto notes that Gibran avowedly imitated the style of the Bible, whereas other Arabic authors from his time like Rihani unconsciously imitated the Quran.

According to Ghougassian, the works of English poet William Blake "played a special role in Gibran's life", and in particular "Gibran agreed with Blake's apocalyptic vision of the world as the latter expressed it in his poetry and art." Gibran wrote of Blake as "the God-man," and of his drawings as "so far the profoundest things done in English—and his vision, putting aside his drawings and poems, is the most godly." According to George Nicolas El-Hage,

Gibran was also a great admirer of Syrian poet and writer Francis Marrash, whose works Gibran had studied at the Collège de la Sagesse. According to Shmuel Moreh, Gibran's own works echo Marrash's style, including the structure of some of his works and "many of [his] ideas on enslavement, education, women's liberation, truth, the natural goodness of man, and the corrupted morals of society." Bushrui and Jenkins have mentioned Marrash's concept of universal love, in particular, in having left a "profound impression" on Gibran.

Another influence on Gibran was American poet Walt Whitman, whom Gibran followed "by pointing up the universality of all men and by delighting in nature. According to El-Hage, the influence of German philosopher Friedrich Nietzsche "did not appear in Gibran's writings until The Tempests." Nevertheless, although Nietzsche's style "no doubt fascinated" him, Gibran was "not the least under his spell":

Critics
Gibran was for a long time neglected by scholars and critics. Bushrui and John M. Munro have argued that "the failure of serious Western critics to respond to Gibran" resulted from the fact that "his works, though for the most part originally written in English, cannot be comfortably accommodated within the Western literary tradition." According to El-Hage, critics have also "generally failed to understand the poet's conception of imagination and his fluctuating tendencies towards nature."

Visual art

Overview
According to Waterfield, "Gibran was confirmed in his aspiration to be a Symbolist painter" after working in Marcel-Béronneau's studio in Paris. Oil paint was Gibran's "preferred medium between 1908 and 1914, but before and after this time he worked primarily with pencil, ink, watercolor and gouache." In a letter to Haskell, Gibran wrote that "among all the English artists Turner is the very greatest." In her diary entry of March 17, 1911, Haskell recorded that Gibran told her he was inspired by J. M. W. Turner's painting The Slave Ship (1840) to utilize "raw colors [...] one over another on the canvas [...] instead of killing them first on the palette" in what would become the painting Rose Sleeves (1911, Telfair Museums).

Gibran created more than seven hundred visual artworks, including the Temple of Art portrait series. His works may be seen at the Gibran Museum in Bsharri; the Telfair Museums in Savannah, Georgia; the Museo Soumaya in Mexico City; Mathaf: Arab Museum of Modern Art in Doha; the Brooklyn Museum and the Metropolitan Museum of Art in New York City; and the Harvard Art Museums. A possible Gibran painting was the subject of a September 2008 episode of the PBS TV series History Detectives.

Gallery

Religious views

According to Bushrui and Jenkins,

Besides Christianity, Islam and Sufism, Gibran's mysticism was also influenced by theosophy and Jungian psychology.

Around 1911–1912, Gibran met with ʻAbdu'l-Bahá, the leader of the Baháʼí Faith who was visiting the United States, to draw his portrait. The meeting made a strong impression on Gibran. One of Gibran's acquaintances later in life, Juliet Thompson, herself a Baháʼí, reported that Gibran was unable to sleep the night before meeting him. This encounter with ʻAbdu'l-Bahá later inspired Gibran to write Jesus the Son of Man that portrays Jesus through the "words of seventy-seven contemporaries who knew him – enemies and friends: Syrians, Romans, Jews, priests, and poets." After the death of ʻAbdu'l-Bahá, Gibran gave a talk on religion with Baháʼís and at another event with a viewing of a movie of ʻAbdu'l-Bahá, Gibran rose to proclaim in tears an exalted station of ʻAbdu'l-Bahá and left the event weeping.

In the poem "The Voice of the Poet", published in A Tear and a Smile (1914), Gibran wrote:

In 1921, Gibran participated in an "interrogatory" meeting on the question "Do We Need a New World Religion to Unite the Old Religions?" at St. Mark's Church in-the-Bowery.

Political thought
According to Young,

Nevertheless, Gibran called for the adoption of Arabic as a national language of Syria, considered from a geographic point of view, not as a political entity. When Gibran met ʻAbdu'l-Bahá in 1911–12, who traveled to the United States partly to promote peace, Gibran admired the teachings on peace but argued that "young nations like his own" be freed from Ottoman control. Gibran also wrote the famous "Pity the Nation" poem during these years, posthumously published in The Garden of the Prophet.

On May 26, 1916, Gibran wrote a letter to Mary Haskell that reads: "The famine in Mount Lebanon has been planned and instigated by the Turkish government. Already 80,000 have succumbed to starvation and thousands are dying every single day. The same process happened with the Christian Armenians and applied to the Christians in Mount Lebanon." Gibran dedicated a poem named "Dead Are My People" to the fallen of the famine.

When the Ottomans were eventually driven from Syria during World War I, Gibran sketched a euphoric drawing "Free Syria", which was then printed on the special edition cover of the Arabic-language paper As-Sayeh (The Traveler; founded 1912 in New York by Haddad). Adel Beshara reports that, "in a draft of a play, still kept among his papers, Gibran expressed great hope for national independence and progress. This play, according to Khalil Hawi, 'defines Gibran's belief in Syrian nationalism with great clarity, distinguishing it from both Lebanese and Arab nationalism, and showing us that nationalism lived in his mind, even at this late stage, side by side with internationalism.

According to Waterfield, Gibran "was not entirely in favour of socialism (which he believed tends to seek the lowest common denominator, rather than bringing out the best in people)".

Legacy
The popularity of The Prophet grew markedly during the 1960s with the American counterculture and then with the flowering of the New Age movements. It has remained popular with these and with the wider population to this day. Since it was first published in 1923, The Prophet has never been out of print. It has been translated into more than 100 languages, making it among the top ten most translated books in history. It was one of the best-selling books of the twentieth century in the United States.

Elvis Presley referred to Gibran's The Prophet for the rest of his life after receiving his first copy as a gift from his girlfriend June Juanico in July 1956. His marked-up copy still exists in Lebanon and another at the Elvis Presley museum in Düsseldorf. A line of poetry from Sand and Foam (1926), which reads "Half of what I say is meaningless, but I say it so that the other half may reach you," was used by John Lennon and placed, though in a slightly altered form, into the song "Julia" from the Beatles' 1968 album The Beatles (a.k.a. "The White Album").

Johnny Cash recorded The Eye of the Prophet as an audio cassette book, and Cash can be heard talking about Gibran's work on a track called "Book Review" on his 2003 album Unearthed. British singer David Bowie mentioned Gibran in the song "The Width of a Circle" from Bowie's 1970 album The Man Who Sold the World. Bowie used Gibran as a "hip reference," because Gibran's work A Tear and a Smile became popular in the hippie counterculture of the 1960s. In 1978 Uruguayan musician Armando Tirelli recorded an album based on The Prophet. In 2016 Gibran's fable "On Death" from The Prophet was composed in Hebrew by Gilad Hochman to the unique setting of soprano, theorbo and percussion, and it premiered in France under the title River of Silence.

In 2018  and Dana Al Fardan devoted their musical Broken Wings to Kahlil Gibran's novel of the same name. The world premiere was staged in London's Theatre Royal Haymarket.

Memorials and honors

A number of places, monuments and educational institutions throughout the world are named in honor of Gibran, including the Gibran Museum in Bsharri, the Gibran Memorial Plaque in Copley Square, Boston, the Gibran Khalil Gibran Garden in Beirut, the Kahlil Gibran Memorial Garden in Washington, D.C., the Khalil Gibran International Academy in Brooklyn, and the Khalil Gibran Elementary School in Yonkers, NY.

A crater on Mercury was named in his honor in 2009.

Family
American sculptor Kahlil G. Gibran (1922–2008) was a cousin of Gibran. The Katter political family in Australia was also related to Gibran. He was described in parliament as a cousin of Bob Katter Sr., a long time member of the Australian parliament and one-time Minister for the Army, and through him his son Bob Katter, founder of Katter's Australian Party and former Queensland state minister, and state politician Robbie Katter.

Notes

References

Citations

Cited works

Further reading
 
  Preview of first eleven article pages at

External links

 
 
 
 
 Gibran Museum, Bsharri, Lebanon
 Online copies of texts by Gibran
 Kahlil Gibran: Profile and Poems on Poets.org
 BBC World Service: "The Man Behind the Prophet"
 The Kahlil Gibran Collective, website including a digital archive of his works
 Featured Author: Kahlil Gibran in The New York Times Archives

 
1883 births
1931 deaths
20th-century American novelists
20th-century American painters
20th-century American poets
20th-century American short story writers
20th-century Lebanese painters
20th-century Lebanese poets
20th-century deaths from tuberculosis
20th-century painters from the Ottoman Empire
20th-century poets from the Ottoman Empire
Alcohol-related deaths in New York City
Académie Julian alumni
American Arabic-language poets
Cultural history of Boston
Deaths from cirrhosis
Exophonic writers
Lebanese novelists
Lebanese short story writers
Mahjar
Novelists from the Ottoman Empire
People from Bsharri
Symbolist painters
Symbolist poets
Tuberculosis deaths in New York (state)
Writers who illustrated their own writing
20th-century Christian mystics
American Christian mystics